

Gokul Ashram, Amravati 

Located in the Tapowan Hills region of the Amravati district, Gokul Ashram was established in 2015 by Mrs. Gunjantai Gole    under the 'Women's Foundation, Amravati'. The purpose of this organization is to provide aid and assistance to children affected by HIV.

Currently, the ashram under Gunjantai’s care provides assistance to approximately 30 resident children who have been affected by HIV. Additionally, the organization provides support to over 100 children who have been affected by HIV, including orphans and those who are destitute, by meeting their medical, educational, and employment needs.

Other Initiatives 

The organization is engaged in various service-oriented activities, including:

 Providing guidance and support to lactating mothers through a milk donation movement, which helps to feed many newborn babies with their own mother's milk.
 Rehabilitating street mental patients by providing food and first aid.
 Arranging and funding funeral rites for orphaned bodies in the city.
 Working towards the uplifting of unmarried women, and rehabilitating them by providing assistance with all medical and legal matters.
 Conducting public awareness workshops and lectures on neglected topics such as HIV, menstruation, and mental health throughout Maharashtra.
 Enhancing the morale of girls and women by providing self-defense lessons in schools and colleges across Maharashtra.
 Providing aid in disaster situations such as floods and earthquakes.
 Educating needy women by providing employment opportunities through savings groups.
 Working towards the health and education of women and children in forest areas.
 Distributing a 'Protein Kit' to needy HIV-affected children and women every month.

References